Faez is an Arabic surname. Notable people with the surname include:

 Ali Faez (born 1994), Iraqi footballer
 Ana Faez (born 1972), Cuban fencer

See also
 Faiz
 Fayez

Arabic-language surnames